The 1st South American Youth Championships in Athletics were held in Comodoro Rivadavia, Argentina from November 2–4, 1973.

Medal summary
Medal winners are published for boys and girls.
Complete results can be found on the "World Junior Athletics History" website.

Men

Women

Medal table (unofficial)

Participation (unofficial)
Detailed result lists can be found on the "World Junior Athletics History" website.  An unofficial count yields the number of about 182 athletes from about 7 countries:  

 (38)
 (34)
 (32)
 (9)
 (22)
 Perú (32)
 (15)

References

External links
World Junior Athletics History

1973 in Argentine sport
South American U18 Championships
South American U18 Championships in Athletics
International athletics competitions hosted by Argentina
1973 in South American sport
November 1973 sports events in South America